Miričina is a village in the municipality of Gračanica, Bosnia and Herzegovina.

Geography 
Miričina neighbors with villages of Berkovica (municipality of Lukavac), Rašljeva and Orahovica Donja (Municipality of Gračanica), and Porječina (Municipality of Petrovo Selo).

Economy 
Regionally renowned elevator factory Euro-Prost d.o.o employs 139 employees, who are mostly local workforce. Fast-growing companies such as Euro Stil and Alu Roll contributing to the development of the economy at the local level as well.

Demographics 
According to the 2013 census, its population was 2,266.

References

Populated places in Gračanica